Tepache Municipality is a municipality in Sonora in north-western Mexico.

Its seat is Tepache.

Area and population
The municipal area is 752.85 km2.  The municipal population counted in 2000 was 1,539, of which 779 were male and 760 were female.  The population of the main settlement and municipal seat was 1,448 in 2000.  The majority (96 percent) of its population lives in urban areas, with the rest living in rural areas. The population has been decreasing steadily since 1980.  The main settlement is located at an elevation of 1,250 meters.

Neighboring municipalities
Neighboring municipalities are Divisaderos Municipality and Moctezuma Municipality to the north, Nácori Chico Municipality to the east, Sahuaripa Municipality to the west and San Pedro de la Cueva Municipality to the southwest.

References

Municipalities of Sonora